Margaret Raia (1929 – August 17, 2003), also known as Margie Raia, was an American actress with dwarfism, best known for her role as one of the Munchkin villagers in the 1939 film The Wizard of Oz. During production, MGM officials discovered that Raia was underage and as a result she was expelled from the set halfway through filming. Her brother, Matthew Raia, also appeared as a munchkin in the film.

Life and career 
Raia was born in Long Island, New York in 1929. Raia was a dwarf actress in The Wizard of Oz, and played a munchkin villager.

On August 17, 2003, Raia died from a brain seizure in Port Richey, Florida, at the age of 74.

See also 
 Munchkin#Actors and actresses

References

External links
 
 The Munchkins (of Oz) at thejudyroom.com
 Margaret RAIA at AFI
 Wizard of Oz with a list of Munchkins at TMC

1929 births
2003 deaths
20th-century American actresses
Actors with dwarfism
American film actresses
21st-century American women
Neurological disease deaths in Florida